Cadini di Misurina (Ciadìs de Meśorìna in Ladin) is a group of mountains in the eastern Dolomites in the Province of Belluno, Italy. These mountains rise to the west of Auronzo di Cadore, north-east of Cortina d'Ampezzo and south of Dobbiaco, in a position overlooking Lake Misurina. They are part of the Dolomites subsection of Sesto, of Braies, and of Ampezzo, and belong to the municipality of Auronzo di Cadore. The highest peak is the Cima Cadin of San Lucano (2.839 m a.s.l.).

The term Cadini derives from the Cadorino dialect ''ciadìn'' which translates into valleys, and refers to the labyrinthian structure of the massif.

Description 

The mountain range is crossed by the Alta Via n. 4 path and from the equipped Alberto Bonacossa path, which starts from the southern shore of the lake and reaches the Tre Cime di Lavaredo. The particular geomorphology that characterizes the Cadini di Misurina allows one to cross the group by various lines so that, going up and down from their forks, it becomes possible to enjoy the dolomitic paradise that surrounds them. The equipped path Giovanni Durissini allows for example to complete tour of the branch of San Lucano. It is a ring route, starting at the Fonda-Savio refuge (2,367 m) , which runs in sequence the Torre fork (2,400 m), the Sabbee fork (2,440 m) , the Cadin Deserto fork (2,400 m), the Cristina fork, the de la Neve fork (2,471 m) and lastly the Nevaio fork (2,620 m) , with a total height difference of about 1,000 M. The first climb dates back to 31 August 1896 by Giovanni Siorpaes, Pietro Siorpaes, Ilona Eötvös, Rolanda Eötvös, Johann Innerkofler, and Loránd Eötvös.

Accommodation facilities include refuge Fonda-Savio (2367 m), refuge Col da Varda (2115 m), and refuge Città di Carpi (2110 m).

Main summits 
 Cima Cadin di San Lucano, 2839 m
 Cima Eötvös, 2825 m
 Cima Cadin Nord Est, 2788 m
 Cima Cadin della Neve, 2757 m
 Cima Cadin Nord Ovest, 2726 m
 Campanile Dülfer, 2706 m
 Cima Cadin di Misurina, 2674 m
 Torre del Diavolo, 2598 m
 Torre Siorpaes, 2553 m
 Torre Wundt, 2517 m
 Cima Cadin di Rimbianco, 2404 m
 Torre Leo, 2550 m
 Punta Cadin de le Pere, 2550 m

Main passes 
 Forcella del Nevaio, 2620 m
 Forcella Verzi, 2550 m
 Forcella de la Neve, 2471 m
 Forcella Sabbiosa, 2440 m
 Forcella di Misurina, 2400 m
 Forcella Cadin Deserto, 2400 m
 Forcella della Torre, 2400 m
 Forcella del Diavolo, 2380 m
 Forcella Maraia, 2100 m

References 
 AA. VV.: Grande atlante escursionistico delle Dolomiti, Kompass - Fleischmann editori, Trento, 2004. 
 Bonetti, Paolo; Lazzarin, Paolo; Rocca, Marco: Dolomiti. Nuovi sentieri selvaggi, Zanichelli editore, Bologna, 2007. 
 Dibona, Dino: Tutto quello che vorreste (e dovreste) sapere sulle Dolomiti, Newton & Compton editori, 2005. 
 Sombardier, Pascal: Dolomiti - le più belle vie ferrate, White Star edizioni, 2000. 
 Treccani, Giovanni: Enciclopedia Italiana Treccani, Istituto Poligrafico dello Stato, Roma, 1951.
 Marazzi, Sergio (2005). Atlante Orografico delle Alpi. SOIUSA. Pavone Canavese: Priuli & Verlucca.
 Danilo de Martin, Il paesaggio dolomitico, panorami dai Cadini di Misurina, Tipolitografia Print House Cortina d'Ampezzo, luglio 2008.

Dolomites
Mountains of Italy